Rogate is a village and civil parish in the Chichester district of West Sussex, England, in the Western Rother valley. The civil parish includes the villages of Rogate and Rake and the hamlets of Haben, Fyning, Hill Brow, Langley, Durford, Wenham, Durleighmarsh and Terwick Common.

History
Rogate is not mentioned by name in the Domesday Survey, but was assumed to be part of Harting Manor. It was in the Hundred of Dumpford, and Chichester rape, diocese and archdeaconery. It was in the Midhurst union, county court district and rural deanery. During the reign of Edward III (1327-1377) it was held by Ralph de Camois who was granted a charter for a fair.

Until the passing of the Counties (Detached Parts) Act 1844 part of the parish of Rogate was an exclave of the county of Sussex within Hampshire. This was a large farm called Bohunt, just south-west of Liphook. Also, a small exclave of Hampshire and the parish of Bramshott called Crouch House Farm was in the north-east corner of Rogate parish and was transferred to it.

An annual fair was held on 27 September.

In the 2001 census the civil parish covered  and had 623 households with a total population of 1,513. 716 residents were economically active.

Governance
An electoral ward in the same name exists. This ward includes Milland and at the 2011 census had a total population of 2,447.

Amenities

Worship
The parish has Church of England churches in both Rogate and Rake villages. Rogate's church is dedicated to St Bartholomew and parish registers date from 1558.

The ancient parish of Terwick is included in Rogate and the northern part of the parish is in the ecclesiastical parish of Milland.

Education
There are primary schools in both Rogate and Rake. In 2008 Rogate School was the subject of a successful campaign to overturn a council recommendation to close the school. In February 2011 the school was judged 'Outstanding' by Ofsted. In 2015 however the school was deemed inadequate and recommended for special measures.

Community centres
Both Rogate and Rake have village halls.

Pubs
The only pub in Rogate village is the White Horse, following the closure of the Wyndham Arms. The Jolly Drover at Hill Brow and The Flying Bull at Rake on the old London to Portsmouth road lie just within the parish and county boundary, which runs through the middle of The Flying Bull pub. In 2011 the Sun Inn closed and in 2012 planning permission was granted for conversion to two houses for residential use. Rake had another pub, now closed: The Red Lion, opposite The Flying Bull on the London Road, which was the scene of a murder in 1748.

Farm
Durleighmarsh farm and farm shop are noted for asparagus, strawberries, runner beans and squash.

References

External links 

Historical information on GENUKI

Villages in West Sussex
Chichester District